The Kansas City Country Club (KCCC) was founded in 1896 in Kansas City, Missouri and today located in Mission Hills, Kansas. The Country Club District and Country Club Plaza of Kansas City are named for the club, which claims to be the third-oldest country club west of the Mississippi River.

History 
The club has its roots in an informal golf course in the Hyde Park neighborhood of Kansas City, Missouri.  In 1896, Hugh C. Ward, Charles Fessenden Morse, Jefferson Brumback, H. L. Harmon, A. W. Childs, C. J. Hubbard, J. E. Logan, Gardiner Lathrop, St. Clair Street, Ford Harvey, E. H. Chapman, E. S. Washburn, and W. B. Clarke incorporated the Kansas City Country Club and leased a pasture at what today is Loose Park in the Sunset Hill neighborhood of Kansas City, Missouri. The tract of land belonged to Ward's father Seth E. Ward, a pioneer who made his fortune outfitting settlers on the Oregon Trail.

In 1907, J. C. Nichols began buying land surrounding the course to develop the Country Club District, and later to develop the Country Club Plaza. In 1925, the club moved its course a mile west to the banks of Brush Creek in Mission Hills. The club's former grounds then became Loose Park. The three J.C. Nichols Clubs became the most socially desirable in the Kansas City Metropolitan area with Kansas City Country Club being first, followed by Mission Hills followed by Indian Hills.

The course was originally designed by Tom Bendelow and later redesigned by A. W. Tillinghast. The course par is 70.

Members
The club's most famous player is Tom Watson, though Watson did resign as a member in 1990 over the club's refusal to admit billionaire H&R Block founder Henry Bloch because he was Jewish. Ray Watson, Tom's father, still holds the amateur record of 64 for the course. Tom Watson holds the professional record of 60. Tom is currently a member of the club.

See also
The Kansas City Club
The Mission Hills Country Club, a nearby country club in the same city

References

External links

1896 establishments in Kansas
Golf clubs and courses in Kansas
Golf clubs and courses in Missouri
Sports in the Kansas City metropolitan area
Golf clubs and courses designed by A. W. Tillinghast
Golf clubs and courses designed by Robert Trent Jones
Buildings and structures in Johnson County, Kansas